Moravian traditional music or Moravian folk music represents a part of the European musical culture connected with the Moravian region of the Czech Republic. Styles of Moravian traditional music vary by location and subject, but much of it is characterized by a specific melodic and harmonic texture related to the Eastern European musical world. According to Czech musicologist Jiří Plocek, Moravia is the area where the European East musically meets the West.

Moravian folk bands are mainly centered on a string section and a large cimbalom, which are often complemented by other instruments. Moravian traditional music influenced Czech classical composers, such as Antonín Dvořák, Bedřich Smetana and Leoš Janáček, who was at the forefront of the Moravian folklore movement. Towards the end of the 20th century, Moravian folk music had a noticeable influence on the Czech jazz scene, and folk songs have been adapted into rock bands' repertoires. Today, there are many festivals still held throughout Moravia with performances from traditional bands and dance ensembles.

History 

Moravia, today a part of the Czech Republic, was settled by Slavic tribes in the 6th century. Today, however, little is known about this period. Following the decline of Great Moravia in the 9th and 10th centuries, Moravia was captured by the Přemyslid dynasty and became a part of the Bohemian Kingdom. During the medieval war-invasions, exotic armies of Turks and Tatars came to the region. Echoes of these dramatic events can be found in the lyrics of Moravian folk songs. Distinct styles of folk music began to emerge during the Wallachian colonization of the 16th and 17th centuries, separating Bohemian and Moravian traditional music. The "new Hungarian" style has influenced the music of the area in the past three centuries, especially in Southern Moravia. This influence has left a deep imprint on the unusual melodic variegation of Moravian traditional music providing an inspirational source for subsequent Classical, Jazz and Pop music composers.

The Czech National Revival in the 19th century represented an important turning point for traditional music. The "Gubernial Collecting Action" at the beginning of the 19th century was responsible for documenting folk music of the entire Austro-Hungarian Empire. Later, in 1835, the priest František Sušil (1804–1868) published Moravské národní písně (Moravian National Songs), the founding collection of Moravian folk songs. The second important collector of folk songs was the dialectologist and folklorist František Bartoš (1837–1906), who published his collection Nové národní písně moravské s nápěvy do textu vřaděnými (New Moravian National Songs with Melodies Integrated to Text) in 1882. He closely collaborated with Czech composer Leoš Janáček who later became the leader of the Moravian folklore movement and organized the first phonograph recordings of Moravian folk music; these represent the oldest documentation of Moravian folk music. Janáček's written collection of Moravian love-songs (Moravské písně milostné) was published in 1930, after his death.  Many other valuable regional folk-song collections were also published during this time and collecting activities continued through the second half of the 20th century. Today tens of thousands of folk songs from Moravia are archived in the Ethnographic Division of the Academy of Sciences of the Czech Republic.

Main characteristics 
The traditional music of Western Moravia is closely related to the music of Bohemia. It was influenced by folk music of Germany and other western regions as well as classical music, especially in the Baroque and Classical eras. The music is mainly written in major keys, and its rhythm and structure are regular and firm.

The music of Southeastern Moravia differs substantially. Its character is closely related to the musical style of Eastern Europe using rather minor keys and melodic elements characteristic of eastern countries such as Ukraine, Slovakia, Romania and Hungary. Here it is also possible to find elements of gypsy scales which contain augmented intervals unusual for the traditional music of Western Europe. One of the most important elements of the traditional music of Southeastern Moravia is emotional variegation and greater rhythmic leeway.

Moravian folk music performances use various traditional and characteristic instruments. "Cimbalom bands" are among the most visible and iconic ensembles that perform traditional music today. The "small" cimbalom characteristic of Moravian music in the 19th century, however, has been replaced by the "standard" (or Hungarian) cimbalom, a rather new instrument only gaining wide use in the 20th century. The leader and "conductor" of the cimbalom band is often a violinist, called "primáš" in Czech, who plays the leading melody with ornamentation. A second violinist, "obligát", often plays the plain melody and supports the "primáš". The harmonic variety of the string instruments is often supported also by other violinists or violists. They are called  "terc" as they usually play a third lower than the leading melody or "kontry", playing accompaniments. Other important instruments of the Moravian cimbalom band are clarinet, ornamenting the melody, and double bass.

Moravian folk bands often perform in various line-ups as some types of songs require specific instrumental accompaniment.  For example, "hudecké" songs only require a string section. The traditional line-up of hudecká muzika (string band) consists of fiddle (prim), viola (kontra) and bass. Bagpipes, gajdy in Moravian dialects, are integral to the fabric of "gajdošská muzika", often accompanied by violin (prim), viola (kontra) and double bass. Removing some typical violin features lead to the origin of an instrument nicknamed the squeaking fiddle in the former Bohemian-German area of the Jihlava region. This type of homemade "folk fiddle" is the leading instrument of skřipkařská muzika ("squeaking fiddle band"). Other songs may require unusual instruments such as simple whistles, pipes, flutes and recorders, hurdy-gurdy and jaw harps.

Moravian traditional folk songs are separated into various specific types, of which the most famous is probably the verbuňk, the specific male recruit dance of Moravian Slovakia. Koichiro Matsuura, the General-Director of UNESCO in 2005 proclaimed the Moravian verbuňk as the part of the Intangible Cultural Heritage of Mankind.

Types of Moravian folk songs

Love songs – the most numerous category dealing with feelings of love in various forms (joyous songs, sad songs)
Wedding songs
Recruitment and army songs – including, for example, songs relating to the Battle of Austerlitz

Pastoral songs (in Czech: pastevecké písně)
Jocular songs – with ironic and sharp remarks focusing on human weaknesses
Drinking songs – in praise of the scent and flavour of wine and spirits; poking fun at those who drink too much
Ceremonial songs – carnival songs, work songs, dance songs, carols
Funeral choir songs – This form has survived only in the Horňácko Region.

Moravian ethnographic regions 
Moravia is ethnographically divided into approximately ten regions, some of which, Dolňácko for example, are divided further into subregions.

 Central and western Moravia – The traditional music of this large area is oriented rather to Bohemian folk culture.
 Northeastern Moravia – Closer to the Carpathian circle of folk culture, the region is influenced by Slovak and Polish culture.
 Southeastern Moravia (southeast of Brno) – This area has many different ethnographic regions collectively known as Slovácko (Moravian Slovakia). The regions and subregions also encompass the districts of Hodonín and Uherské Hradiště, and partially stretch into the districts of Břeclav and Zlín.

Folklorism 
Moravian traditional folk music has served as a source and inspiration to many different musical genres including classical composers such as Antonín Dvořák, Leoš Janáček, Vítězslav Novák and Bohuslav Martinů. Following World War II and the Czechoslovak coup d'état of 1948, folk songs were used as a part of the communist cultural programme. Ideology-influenced folk-song propaganda was created in order to support the new régime. The movement soon vanished, however, and the principles of traditional folk music headed toward more sophisticated processing. The "off-key and creaky" music of old village musicians was often replaced by the academic and virtuosic expression of professional players, typically represented by the Brněnský rozhasový orchestr lidových nástrojů (BROLN) (The Orchestra of Traditional Folk Instruments of the Brno Radio). In the second half of the 20th century, traditional folk bands were replaced with "chamber orchestras" which performed folk arrangements. Regional variability and originality was almost lost. Traditional music partially returned to its roots in the last decade of the 20th century and slowly began to restore its distinctives.

The musical structure of Moravian folk song also influenced many jazz artists. Czech jazz musicians led by Karel Velebný and Jaromír Hnilička recorded the album "Týnom, tánom" in 1970, the first attempt to arrange the folk songs into jazz compositions. Other jazz musicians who have used elements of folk music include Jiří Stivín (Inspirations by Folklore CD) and Emil Viklický (Morava, 2003 CD, together with Billy Hart, George Mraz and Zuzana Lapčíková).

The songwriter Petr Ulrych, the founder of the band Javory, was one of the first musicians to deal with traditional music in the 1980s. Ulrych closely collaborated with violinist Jiří Pavlica, the leader of the cimbalom band Hradišťan. Hradišťan, a well-known traditional folk band, later turned away from folklore and focused on fusion in various world music projects (Yas-Kaz, Dizu Plaatjies and Altai Kai collaborations among others).

Widespread use of traditional folk music in the repertoire of Czech rock bands began in the 1990s. Significant representatives of this genre are Čechomor, Fleret and Vlasta Redl. Another important musician who deals with Moravian traditional music is the avant-garde singer and violinist Iva Bittová.

Traditional music festivals in Moravia 

 
Annual festivals:
The following festivals are held annually unless otherwise noted.

May
Jízda králů (Ride of the Kings) Festival in Vlčnov
Podluží v písni a tanci (Podluží in Songs and Dance Festival) – held in Tvrdonice

June
Kosecké písně – held in Buchlovice
International Folklore Festival in Frýdek-Místek
Rožnovská valaška – held in Rožnov pod Radhoštěm
International Folklore Festival in Strážnice

July
Rožnovské slavnosti – held in Rožnov pod Radhoštěm 
International Folklore Festival "Evropské setkání národů" (European Meeting of Nations) – held in Telč
Kopaničářské slavnosti (Kopanice Festival) – held in Starý Hrozenkov
International Folklore Festival in Svatobořice-Mistřín
Horňácké slavnosti (Horňácko Festival) – held in Velká nad Veličkou
Romská píseň (Romani Song Festival) – held in Rožnov pod Radhoštěm

August
Národopisný festival Kyjovska (Ethnographic Festival of the Kyjovsko Region) – held in Milotice
Slovácký rok (Moravian Slovakian Year Festival) – the oldest Moravian folklore festival, held every four years in Kyjov
International Folklore Festival "Folklór bez hranic" (Folklore Without Borders) – held in Ostrava
International Folklore Festival in Šumperk
Festival in Liptál

August/September
International Folklore Festival in Brno

September
Hanácké slavnosti (Hanakian Festival) – held in Prostějov
Slovácké slavnosti vína a otevřených památek (Slovácko Wine Festival And Open Monuments Days) – held in Uherské Hradiště

October
Festival hudebních nástrojů (Festival of Musical Instruments) – held in Uherské Hradiště

Selected recordings

Historical recordings 

Nejstarší nahrávky moravského a slovenského lidového zpěvu 1909-1912. (The oldest recordings of Moravian and Slovakian traditional folk songs). (GNOSIS Brno, 1998) – phonographic recordings, made by Leoš Janáček and his collaborators.
Ňorkova muzika z Hrubé Vrbky: Drsná pohlazení (ATON, 1999) – a representative selection of recordings from Horňácko region, 1932–1957
Muzika Jožky Kubíka: Dalekonosné husle (Czech Radio Brno and GNOSIS Brno, 1998) – a representative selection of recordings from Horňácko region, 1953–1972
František Okénka: Preleteuo vtáča (GNOSIS Brno, 1996)
Strážnice Folklore Festival (Supraphon, 1994) – archive recordings from 1946 to 1994.
Václav Harnoš, Jan Gajda a CM Slávka Volavého: Ve Strážnici néni pána (Danaj 2000) – archive recordings (1959–1993)
Majstr Jožka Kubík (ATON, 1999) – archive recordings from Horňácko region
Jan Miklošek (ATON 2000)
Zpěvákovo rozjímání (ATON 2000) – the singer Martin Holý (1902–1985), archive recordings
Jaroslav Kovářík, zpěvák z Kobylí (JK 0001-2431, 2000) – recordings from Hanakian Moravian Slovakia region, 1956–2000
Mezinárodní folklorní festival ve Strážnici (International Folklore Festival in Strážnice), 1995-2000 – published by the Institute of the Traditional Folk Culture in Strážnice, 2000

Regional recordings 

Antologie moravské lidové hudby - komplet 5CD. Epic five-disc Anthology of Moravian folk music of the early 21st century (Indies Scope, 2012)

Horňácko region (Upper Moravian Slovakia)
Horňácký hudec Martin Hrbáč. (GNOSIS Brno, 1995)
Pěkné kázáníčko od Martina Hrbáče (TONSTUDIO Rajchman, 1999)
Došli sme k vám (INDIES, 1996) – traditional folk choirs from Horňácko region
Horňácká cimbálová muzika Petra Galečky: Moja žena smutno plače (TONSTUDIO Rajchman, 1997)
Velička: Ej, v tom velickém mlýně (TONSTUDIO Rajchman, 1998)
Zpívání z Horňácka (INDIES, 1998)
Jura Hudeček z Velké (ATON 2000)
Horňácká muzika Miroslava Minkse: Pesnyčky ze Lhoték (GNOSIS Brno, 1999)
Cimbálová muzika Petra Galečky: Ó lásko fortelná (TONSTUDIO Rajchman, 2000)
Veličánek: Małučký sem já był (Velká nad Veličkou, 2001)
Lipovjan: Na dolinách pod lipami (TONSTUDIO Rajchman, 1999)

Hradištské Dolňácko region (Uherské Hradiště Lower Moravian Slovakia)
Včelaran: Ballad of Veruna (BONTON, 1991)
Karel Rajmic – Cimbálová muzika Jaroslava Čecha: Túžení, súžení (LM MUSIC, 1997)
Kunovjan: Ej, u Hradišťa pršalo (STYLTÓN, 1996)
Cimbálová muzika Lúčka: Velikonoční rozjímání (GZ Loděnice, 1996)
Cimbálová muzika Jaroslava Čecha: Muzicírování ve stodole (Klub kultury Uherské Hradiště, 2000)

Strážnické Dolňácko region (Strážnice Lower Moravian Slovakia)  
Cimbálová muzika Danaj: Gajdování (Freli, 1995)
Cimbálová muzika Danaj: Ve Strážnici muzikanti hráli (Multisonic, 1998)
Strážničan: Šla psota přes hory (1997)
Strážničan: Co sa stalo kdysi (TONSTUDIO Rajchman, 1997)
Cimbálová muzika Pavla Múčky: Při strážnickej bráně (TONSTUDIO Rajchman, 1997)
Cimbálová muzika Danaj, Magdalena Múčková: Písničky z malířovy palety (Danaj, 2000)
Cimbálová muzika Radošov (TONSTUDIO Rajchman, 2001)

Kyjovské Dolňácko region (Kyjov Lower Moravian Slovakia)
Cimbálová muzika Jury Petrů: Legrúti jedú... (Region s.r.o., 1994)
Varmužova cimbálová muzika: Písničky z domu (Supraphon, 1994)
Varmužova cimbálová muzika: Na Kyjovsku (GNOSIS Brno, 1997)
Varmužova cimbálová muzika: Chválabohu, že sem sa narodil... (TONSTUDIO Rajchman, 2000)
Cimbálová muzika Jury Petrů: Na kyjovských lúkách (BMG Ariola ČR, 2000)

Hanácké Slovácko region (Hanakian Moravian Slovakia)
Krajem beze stínu (Supraphon)
Cimbálová muzika Vonica z Krumvíře (STYLTÓN, 1998)
Vonica 2000 (STYLTÓN, 2000)

Podluží region
Cimbálová muzika Břeclavan: Hodinka na Podluží (EDIT, 1994)
Vladimír Zháněl s cimbálovou muzikou: Za starů Breclavů (RESTON, 1999)
Cimbálová muzika Zádruha (TONSTUDIO Rajchman, 2001)
Cimbálová muzika Břeclavan: Písně a balady (RESTON, 1999)

Luhačovské Zálesí region
Cimbálová muzika Linda: Svatební písně z Luhačovského Zálesí (STYLTÓN, 1997)
Cimbálová muzika Linda: Rok na Zálesí (STYLTÓN, 2000)

Uherskobrodsko and Kopanice regions
Olšava, OĽUN, BROLN: Dívča z Javoriny (LM MUSIC, 1997)
Kytice z Uherskobrodska (compilation, GNOSIS Brno, 1998)
Hudecká muzika Kopaničář: Okolo Hrozenka (Starý Hrozenkov, 1999)

Valašsko region (Moravian Wallachia)
Cimbálová muzika Polajka: Už zme tady, už zme tu (RS 1992)
Jarmila Šuláková: A vy páni muziganti (Supraphon, 1993)
Jarmila Šuláková: Valaši, Valaši (W MUSIC, 1996)
Cimbálová muzika Vsacan: Chodívali chlapci k nám (1998)
Cimbálová muzika Kašava: Na tom našem potoce (EDIT, 1998)
Cimbálová muzika Jasénka: Trvalky (LM MUSIC, 1998)
Cimbálová muzika Technik (Jan Rokyta): Valašské balady (STYLTÓN, 1999)
Cimbálová muzika Soláň: Při Betlémě na salašu (STYLTÓN, 1995)
Cimbálová muzika Soláň: A tož jaků (LM MUSIC, 1998)
Javorník Brno: Půl století s cimbálovou muzikou (Písnička, 2000)
Cimbálová muzika Soláň, Zdeněk Kašpar a hosté: Vałaské pěsničky (GNOSIS Brno, 2000)
Cimbálová muzika Jasénka: Přes Javorník chodník (GNOSIS Brno, 2001)

Lašsko region (Lachia)
Ondřejnica: Moje Lašsko (STYLTÓN, 1996)
Ondřejnica: Lašské vánoce (STYLTÓN, 1997)
Valašský vojvoda: Písně a tance z lašsko-valašského pomezí (STYLTÓN, 1997)
Cimbálová muzika Ostravica (STYLTÓN, 1996)

Haná region (Hanakia)
Hanácká muzika Ječmeni: V Prostijově na renko (Ječmeni, 1999)
Debe decke tak belo (Moravia Folklor, 2001)

Horácko region 
Studánka 1, 2 (available only on MC)

Notes

References

Further reading

External links 
Antologie moravské lidové hudby - komplet 5CD Indies Scope, 2012
Web pages of the National Institute of the Folk Culture in Strážnice
Folklorweb.cz 
List of cimbalom bands (mainly Dolňácko Region)
Wallachian songs and dance ensemble

Moravia
Folk music by country